Nicole Richardson (born 26 June 1970 in Melbourne) is a softball player from Australia, who won a bronze medal at the 1996 Summer Olympics. She also represented Australia in netball, winning gold at the 2002 Commonwealth Games. Richardson played both centre and wing defence. She played seven seasons with the Melbourne Kestrels in the Commonwealth Bank Trophy. She was captain of the team from 2000 until 2003. She retired from netball in 2003. Since retiring from netball, Richardson has forged a distinctive coaching career. She coached Victorian representative teams at under 17, under 19 and under 21 levels, before becoming head coach of the Netball Australia Centre for Excellence team. During the mid-to-late 2010's, she was assistant coach at Super Netball teams West Coast Fever and Collingwood Magpies, and in 2021 she was appointed head coach of the Magpies.

References

External links
Olympic Info
Netball Australia

1970 births
Living people
Australian softball players
Olympic softball players of Australia
Softball players at the 1996 Summer Olympics
Olympic bronze medalists for Australia
Sportswomen from Victoria (Australia)
Olympic medalists in softball
Sportspeople from Melbourne
Netball players from Melbourne
Medalists at the 1996 Summer Olympics
Australian netball players
Australia international netball players
Commonwealth Games medallists in netball
Commonwealth Games gold medallists for Australia
Netball players at the 2002 Commonwealth Games
Melbourne Kestrels players
Australian Institute of Sport netball players
Esso/Mobil Superleague players
Australian netball coaches
Suncorp Super Netball coaches
2003 World Netball Championships players
Medallists at the 2002 Commonwealth Games